Abr (also known as Abz) is a village in Kharqan Rural District, Bastam District, Shahrud County, Semnan Province, Iran. At the 2006 census, its population was 1,383, in 355 families.

References 

Populated places in Shahrud County